Tokui (written: 徳井) is a Japanese surname. Notable people with the surname include:

, Japanese voice actress, singer and manga artist
, Japanese actor

Japanese-language surnames